Maximilian Baldwin Shacklady (31 December 1918 – 6 March 1986) was a British boxer. He competed in the men's welterweight event at the 1948 Summer Olympics. He fought as Max Shacklady.

Shacklady won the 1948 Amateur Boxing Association British welterweight title, when boxing out of the Eccles ABC.

References

External links
 

1918 births
1986 deaths
British male boxers
Olympic boxers of Great Britain
Boxers at the 1948 Summer Olympics
Sportspeople from Salford
Welterweight boxers